Goodenia viscida, commonly referred to as viscid goodenia, is a species of flowering plant in the family Goodeniaceae and is endemic to the south-west of Western Australia. It is an erect perennial herb or shrub with narrow oblong to egg-shaped leaves with toothed edges, and spikes of yellow flowers.

Description

Taxonomy and naming
Goodenia viscida was first formally described in 1810 by Robert Brown in his Prodromus Florae Novae Hollandiae et Insulae Van Diemen. The specific epithet (viscida) means "sticky", referring to the foliage.

Distribution and habitat
Viscid goodenia grows in moist depressions and near lakes between Esperance and the Stirling Range in the Avon Wheatbelt, Coolgardie, Esperance Plains and Mallee biogeographic regions of south-western Western Australia.

References

viscida
Eudicots of Western Australia
Plants described in 1810
Taxa named by Robert Brown (botanist, born 1773)